Segunda Federación, previously called Segunda División RFEF, also officially known as Segunda B-Segunda Federación, is the fourth tier of the Spanish football league system containing 90 teams divided into five groups. It is administered by the Royal Spanish Football Federation. It is the second tier outside the top two professional leagues, the Primera División (also known as La Liga) and the Segunda División, being behind the Primera Federación and above the Tercera Federación. The division also includes the reserve teams of a number of La Liga and Segunda División teams.

History 
On 6 May 2020, the RFEF announced the creation of a new, two-group, 40-team third division called Primera División RFEF, which resulted in the former third division, Segunda División B, dropping down a level and changing into Segunda División RFEF; the changes were made effective for the 2021–22 campaign.

In July 2022, the division was renamed into Segunda Federación.

Current format
Segunda Federación currently features 90 teams divided into 5 groups of 18. The champions of each group achieve automatic promotion to Primera Federación, while the other top four teams are qualified to a play-off round, where five of the 20 teams qualified also achieve promotion. However reserve teams are only eligible for promotion to the Primera Federación if their senior team is in one division above it. The bottom five teams in each group are relegated to the Tercera Federación. Also, the four worst 13th-placed teams enter into relegation play-offs to determine the two teams to be relegated.

Eligibility of players
Each team of Segunda Federación can have 22 players in their roster, with these two limitations:

 A maximum of 16 players over 23 years old.
 A minimum of 10 players under professional contract.

Groups
The member clubs of the Segunda Federación for the 2022–23 season are listed below.

Winners and promotions

See also
 Spanish football league system

References and notes

External links
 of RFEF 
Soccerway - Segunda Federación

 
4
Spa
Sports leagues established in 2021
2021 establishments in Spain